Suicide Invoice is the second studio album by the San Diego, California rock band Hot Snakes, released in 2002 by Swami Records. It was recorded in a similar manner to the band's previous album Automatic Midnight, with guitarist John Reis taking time off from his main band Rocket from the Crypt. As a visual artist and illustrator singer/guitarist Rick Froberg provided the album's artwork, while Reis released the album through his Swami Records label.

Style

In comparison to the band's previous album Automatic Midnight, Suicide Invoice is slightly slower paced and more experimental, incorporating organs and melodicas which the band had not used before. It is also less aggressive and primal than their subsequent album Audit in Progress.

Promotion

As with Automatic Midnight, touring in support of Suicide Invoice was limited due to the band members residing on opposite sides of the country, though they were able to tour the United States. The following year drummer Jason Kourkounis departed the band and Reis resumed full-time work with Rocket from the Crypt. The band would reunite in 2004 for another album and more extensive touring, replacing Kourkounis with Rocket from the Crypt drummer Mario Rubalcaba.

Reception

The album was quite favorably received. Emma Johnston writes that the album "takes its foot off the pedal a little, and in the process showcases Hot Snakes’ wonderfully snarky side (any album that starts with a song called I Hate The Kids is alright by us) [...]" Joseph Larkin calls it "arguably [the band's] best effort [...] The mostly mid-tempo album is more experimental than its predecessor, incorporating organ, melodica and seriously clever offbeat lyrics (as in "Ben Gurion," "Paid in Cigarettes" and "Gar Forgets His Insulin")." "The only tropes these guys know are 'kicking ass' and 'taking names,'" writes Eric Carr, "and the rest can go to hell, because Suicide Invoice is nothing but rock viscera in its most elegant simplicity. And sometimes, that's all you need."

Daphne Carr was more mixed in her assessment, criticizing the ironic and emotionally distant tone of most of the album ("the album is another study in rock in jokes [...] Froberg's vocals go from raged to sincere, and on "Why Does It Hurt" he almost sheds the rock persona to identify with his listeners—almost.") She concludes by writing "With this album, Hot Snakes only build their repertoire of rock to satisfy the indie kids looking for something as angry as nu-metal with a tinge more self-awareness."

Accolades

Pitchfork ranked it the 35th best album of the year.

Track listing
"I Hate the Kids" - 3:07
"Gar Forgets His Insulin" - 2:22
"XOX" - 2:27
"Who Died" - 2:30
"Suicide Invoice" - 3:25
"Paid in Cigarettes" - 4:08
"LAX" - 2:02
"Bye Nancy Boy" - 2:37
"Paperwork" - 2:47
"Why Does it Hurt" - 1:45
"Unlisted" - 2:46
"Ben Gurion" - 2:58

Personnel
Rick Froberg - guitar, lead vocals
John Reis - guitar, melodica, backing vocals
Gar Wood - bass guitar, Magi 44 organ
Jason Kourkounis (credited as Jsinclair) - drum kit
Frankie Stains - organ on finale of "Paid in Cigarettes"

Album information
Record label: Swami Records
Recorded 2002 at Drag Racist studios by John Reis, Gar Wood and Ben Moore
Mixed at Big Fish Recorders in San Diego by John Reis, Gar Wood and Ben Moore
Artwork by Rick Froberg

References 

2002 albums
Swami Records albums
Hot Snakes albums